USS Huron may refer to the following ships of the United States Navy:

, was an  screw steam gunboat commissioned 8 January 1862 and sold 14 June 1869.
, was an iron sloop-rigged steamer commissioned 15 November 1875 and lost in a storm off Nags Head, North Carolina in November 1877.
, was the former SS Friedrich der Große seized by the United States in 1917 and renamed Huron. She served as a troop transport in World War I and was decommissioned 2 September 1919.
, was a  that was previously named South Dakota (ACR-9).
, was a  completed in 1944 and scrapped in 1947.

United States Navy ship names